The Riders of German East Africa (German: Die Reiter von Deutsch-Ostafrika) is a 1934 German war film directed by Herbert Selpin and starring Sepp Rist, Ilse Stobrawa and Rudolf Klicks. It was shot at the Terra Studios in Berlin and on location at the sand dunes at Marienhöhe in the capital, a former quarry which stood in for Africa. The film's sets were designed by the art directors Robert A. Dietrich and Bruno Lutz. It was based on the novel Kwa Heri by Marie Luise Droop. Although produced as an anti-British propaganda film, it was later banned by the Nazi authorities after the outbreak of the Second World War for not being hostile enough to Britain, while it was also subsequently banned by the Allies in the post-war era for its promotion of militarism.

Plot summary 
Sepp Rist plays the role of Hellhoff, a German farmer in German East Africa, who is conscripted into the Schutztruppe (German armed colonial force) at the beginning of the First World War. His wife Gerda and the young volunteer Klix manage the plantation while he is away. In 1916, the plantation is occupied by a British unit. The commander, Major Cresswell, knows Gerda is secretly supplying Hellhoff and his comrades who are concealed in the bush. He tries to use his old friendship with the Hellhoffs put a stop to her activities. In order to carry out his duty as a British officer, he has his troops occupy the area's water supply to force the German soldiers to surrender. As Hellhoff's wife and Klix are trying to clandestinely supply water to Hellhoff, she is arrested and the boy shot. He still manages to bring the canteen to the soldiers  before he dies. Hellhoff and his men liberate Gerda, who was to be taken away for trial by a British military court, and make off with water and horses. On their way to join up with Paul von Lettow-Vorbeck's East African Schutztruppe command, they stop at Klix's grave. Hellhoff promises the dead boy he will come back sooner or later — an allusion to the recovery of the lost colony through German victory in the Second World War.

Cast 
Sepp Rist as German farmer Peter Hellhoff, Captain of the reserve
Ilse Stobrawa as Gerda Helhoff, his wife
Rudolf Klicks as Hellhoff's student apprentice Wilm Klix
Ludwig Gerner as Hellhoff's assistant Lossow
Lewis Brody as Hellhoff's foreman Hamissi
Gregor Kotto as Hellhof's boy Selemani
Peter Voß as English farmer Robert Cresswell
Georg H. Schnell as Colonel Black, English general staff officer
Vivigenz Eickstedt as English officer
Mohamed Husen as signal student Mustapha
Arthur Reinhardt as safari guide Charles Rallis
Emine Zehra Zinser as servant Milini

References

Bibliography
 Gheorghiu-Cernat, Manuela. Arms and the Film: War-and-peace in European Films. Meridiane, 1983.
 Hull, David Stewart. Film in the Third Reich: A Study of the German Cinema, 1933-1945. University of California Press, 1969.
 Richards, Jeffrey. Visions of Yesterday. Routledge, 1973.

External links 

1934 films
1934 adventure films
German adventure films
Films of Nazi Germany
1930s German-language films
Films directed by Herbert Selpin
German black-and-white films
Films based on German novels
Films set in Tanzania
World War I films set in Africa
Films set in 1916
German war films
1930s German films
Terra Film films
Films shot at Terra Studios
Films shot in Berlin